Sinkin' in the Bathtub is the first Warner Bros. theatrical cartoon short as well as the first of the Looney Tunes series.  The short debuted in April 1930 (most likely April 19),  at the Warner Bros. Theater in Hollywood. The cartoon features Bosko, and the title is a pun on the 1929 song Singin' in the Bathtub. The film was erroneously copyrighted under the same title as the 1929 song, thus entering it into the public domain right away.

The name of the Looney Tunes series bears an obvious debt to the Walt Disney Animation Studios' Silly Symphony series, which began in 1929. Steve Schneider writes that this "immediately reveals Harman and Ising's belief that the only way to compete—or even to survive—in the cartoon trade was to cleave to the Disney version."

Made in 1930, this short marked the theatrical debut of Bosko the "Talk-Ink Kid" whom Harman and Ising had created to show to Warner Brothers. Bosko became their first star character, surpassed only much later by Porky Pig and Daffy Duck. Notably, this is the only publicly released Bosko short to feature Bosko's original blackface dialect provided by animator Carman Maxwell; the character would later adopt a more falsetto voice (played by sound effects man Bernard B. Brown and, later on, singer Johnny Murray) for later films. Bosko's girlfriend Honey was voiced by Rochelle Hudson.

The short was produced, directed, supervised and co-animated by Harman and Ising, with animation by a very young Friz Freleng and his friends. Leon Schlesinger was credited as an associate producer, and the title card also gave credit to the Western Electric apparatus used to create the film.

Frank Marsales served as music director, arranging the tunes to be played by drummer-bandleader Abe Lyman and his orchestra of Brunswick Records musicians. All of the songs were recently popular numbers in the Warner Bros. catalog, which added a cross-promotional aspect. Beyond the title song which is heard at the beginning and the end, tunes included "Tiptoe Through the Tulips", "Lady Luck" from the 1929 film The Show of Shows, "I'm Forever Blowing Bubbles", and "Painting the Clouds with Sunshine".

Plot synopsis 

The film opens with Bosko taking a bath while whistling "Singin' in the Bathtub". A series of gags allows him to play the shower spray like a harp, pull up his pants by tugging his hair, and give the limelight to the bathtub itself, which stands on its hind feet to perform a dance. (There is a clear shot of a toilet during this scene, and the bathtub tears off sheets of toilet paper during its dance, permissible only in the pre-Hays Code days.)

Once he finds his car, which had left the garage to use the outhouse, Bosko goes to visit his girlfriend Honey, who is showering in front of an open window. "Tiptoe Through the Tulips" plays in the background. A goat eats the flowers he brought, so he serenades her to get her to come out. A saxophone full of bubbles (caused when she dumps a bathtub full of soapy water into Bosko's saxophone due to his butchering of "Tiptoe Through the Tulips") provide a floating cascade of steps for her as she alights from the balcony. "I'm Forever Blowing Bubbles" accompanies this action.

Their country drive presents grave perils for Bosko, with the first obstacle being a stubborn grazing cow. After the cow is pushed out of the way, the indignant cow walks away to the tune of Elgar's "Pomp and Circumstance Marches". The drive continues as the car is at first resistant to go up a steep hill, then speeds out of control while Bosko collides into various objects that create the sounds of ascending and descending C major scales. (Bosko exclaims "mammy" in the original version during this portion of the film.) The sequence ends with the car plunging over a cliff into a lake. Always able to adapt, Bosko continues their date as a boating trip and plays the last refrain (a reprise of "Singin' in the Bathtub") using lilypads as a marimba.

The cartoon ends with Bosko saying the now-classic line "That's all Folks!"

Production
This cartoon was first theatrically released with the lost Warner Bros./Vitaphone Technicolor film Song of the Flame.

This is the first publicly released non-Disney cartoon to have a pre-recorded soundtrack (in addition, "Bosko, the Talk-Ink Kid" had a pre-synched track.)

Some of the animation by Hugh Harman and Rudy Ising was lifted from some of the Oswald the Lucky Rabbit cartoons they made a couple of years earlier.

In popular culture
A clip of the cartoon was seen on a 1990 episode of Pee-Wee's Playhouse.

Home media
The short was released on the Looney Tunes Golden Collection: Volume 3 box set.

References

External links 
 
 

1930 films
1930 animated films
1930 short films
Looney Tunes shorts
Warner Bros. Cartoons animated short films
American black-and-white films
1930s English-language films
Animated films about music and musicians
Films directed by Hugh Harman
Films directed by Rudolf Ising
Bosko films
Films scored by Frank Marsales
African-American animated films
1930s Warner Bros. animated short films